Mass media in Laos are based on a network of telephone lines and radiotelephone communications in remote areas, as well as mobile phone infrastructure. The system is not well-developed.

Infrastructure and statistics
In 1997 there were 25,000 telephone lines in use, and in 2007 there were 850,000 mobile cellular subscribers. Laos is served by a Russian Intersputnik satellite that covers the Indian Ocean region.

In 1998 there were 12 AM stations and one FM station. In 1997 there were an estimated 730,000 radios in the country. In 2011 Laos had three television channels. In 2000 there was one Internet service provider, by 2002 serving about 10,000 users. The top-level domain for Laos is .la.

See also
 Telephone numbers in Laos
 Internet in Laos

References 

 
Laos
Laos